PFC may refer to:

Science 
Perfluorinated compounds, organofluorine compounds with hydrogen replaced by fluorine
Perfluorocarbons, fluorocarbon compounds derived from hydrocarbons
 Blood substitutes, some of which are made of perfluorocarbons
Plasma-facing components, in a fusion reactor
Power factor correction of electric loads
Prefrontal cortex, the anterior part of the frontal lobes of the brain
Phonologie du Français Contemporain, French phonology research project
Physiological functional capacity

Economy 
Power Finance Corporation, an Indian financial institution
PFC Energy, a global energy research and consultancy group
Price forward curve, a method to determine the forecasted price of a commodity.

Sports 
Palace Fighting Championship, former US martial arts organization
Paris FC, France
Paulínia FC, São Paulo, Brazil
Persepolis F.C., Tehran, Iran
PFC Beroe Stara Zagora
Port F.C., Thailand
Portsmouth F.C., England
Pacific FC, Vancouver Island, Canada
FK Partizan, Belgrade. Abbreviated from the name of the club in English.

Other uses 
 Passenger facility charge, a tax on air travelers
 Pacific City State Airport (IATA airport code), near Pacific City, Oregon, U.S.
 Playing for Change, a multimedia music project
 Power foundation classes, computer libraries for PowerBuilder
 Priority flow control, Ethernet technology
 Private first class, a junior military rank
 Structural channel, also known as Parallel Flange Channel, a type of beam used primarily in building construction and civil engineering